Moises López (born 3 September 1941) is a Mexican former wrestler who competed in the 1964 Summer Olympics, in the 1968 Summer Olympics, in the 1972 Summer Olympics, and in the 1976 Summer Olympics.

References

External links
 

1941 births
Living people
Sportspeople from Mexico City
Olympic wrestlers of Mexico
Wrestlers at the 1964 Summer Olympics
Wrestlers at the 1968 Summer Olympics
Wrestlers at the 1972 Summer Olympics
Wrestlers at the 1976 Summer Olympics
Mexican male sport wrestlers
Pan American Games medalists in wrestling
Pan American Games silver medalists for Mexico
Wrestlers at the 1975 Pan American Games
Medalists at the 1975 Pan American Games
20th-century Mexican people
21st-century Mexican people